The Loddon Valley Highway runs roughly north-west from Bendigo to Kerang on the Murray Valley Highway. It constitutes part of the direct route from Melbourne to the popular Murray River holiday areas around Swan Hill.

Route
Loddon Valley Highway starts at the intersection with Murray Valley Highway just south of the fringes of Kerang, and runs south as a dual-lane single-carriageway road, running parallel to the Loddon River a short distance to the west of the road for much of its length. It continues south through Durham Ox until it reaches Serpentine, where it veers more to the south-east away from the river course, passing through the hills around Eaglehawk on the outskirts of Greater Bendigo, before it meets the Calder Highway and ends at the intersections of Eaglehawk and Marong Roads in Ironbark, in the north-western suburbs of Bendigo.

History
The Country Roads Board (later VicRoads) declared Loddon Valley Road a Main Road in the 1937/38 financial year, from Murray Valley Highway in Kerang, along roads through Durham Ox and Serpentine, to Calder Highway in Bendigo (for a total of 77 miles).

The passing of the Highways and Vehicles Act of 1924 through the Parliament of Victoria provided for the declaration of State Highways, roads two-thirds financed by the State government through the Country Roads Board; Loddon Valley Road was re-declared Loddon Valley Highway, a State Highway, in 1946.

The Loddon Valley Highway was signed as State Route 141 between Kerang and Bendigo in 1986; with Victoria's conversion to the newer alphanumeric system in the late 1990s, this was replaced by route B260.

The passing of the Road Management Act 2004 granted the responsibility of overall management and development of Victoria's major arterial roads to VicRoads: in 2004, VicRoads re-declared the road as Loddon Valley Highway (Arterial #6630), beginning at Murray Valley Highway at Kerang and ending at Calder Highway in Ironbark, Bendigo.

Major intersections

See also

 Highways in Australia
 Highways in Victoria

References

Highways in Victoria (Australia)